House Arrest is the fifth studio album by American recording artist Ariel Pink, under Pink's "Haunted Graffiti" musical project. It is the fifth album in the eponymous series of albums, as subtitled. It was self-released in September 2002 under the imprint, Demonstration Bootleg, as a double CD set with his follow-up album, Lover Boy.

On January 24, 2006, the album was reissued by Paw Tracks and Ballbearings Pinatas.

Track listing
"Hardcore Pops Are Fun"
"Interesting Results"
"West Coast Calamities"
"Flying Circles"
"Gettin' High in the Morning"
"Helen"
"Every Night I Die at Miyagis"
"House Arrest"
"Alisa"
"The People I'm Not"
"Almost Waiting"
"Oceans of Weep"
"Netherlands"
"Higher and Higher"

coL Drums on "Interesting Results"

All songs written, performed and recorded by
Ariel Pink at 1245 Norton ave. Los Angeles
California Oct. 01 - July 2
on MT8X Yamaha 8 Track cassette.

References 

2002 albums
Ariel Pink albums
Hypnagogic pop albums
Albums recorded in a home studio
Self-released albums